Jonathan Dario "Yoni" Erlich (born 5 April 1977) is an Israeli former professional tennis player. During his career, he was mainly a doubles specialist, having won the men's doubles title at the 2008 Australian Open with Andy Ram. He attained his career-high doubles ranking of world No. 5 in July 2008. Erlich has reached 44 doubles finals and won 22 (half of them), mostly with partner Andy Ram; together, they are known in Israel as "Andyoni". His Davis Cup doubles record, as of 2018, was 22–12.

Background
Jonathan Erlich, who is Jewish, was born in Buenos Aires, Argentina. He moved to Haifa, Israel, when he was a one-year-old, and now resides in Tel Aviv and competes as an Israeli.

Erlich first started playing tennis when he was three years old, and he played his first tournament at the age of seven.  He was later trained at the Wingate Institute, where he met Andy Ram, his future doubles partner. He turned pro in 1996 at the age of 19.

Erlich is known as a fan of the football team Maccabi Haifa.

Tennis career

1996–2005
Erlich and Ram first competed at Queen's Club in June 2001.  In 2002, in singles Erlich defeated world # 64 ranked Adrian Voinea of Romania, 6–2, 6–3, in Indianapolis.

The Israeli duo's best achievement was reaching the semifinal of the Wimbledon championships in 2003.  They defeated Mark Knowles and Daniel Nestor but lost the semifinal to defending Wimbledon champions Jonas Björkman and Todd Woodbridge.  They were the first Israelis to advance to the semifinals in a Grand Slam event.

They won the Thailand Open in September 2003 and the Grand Prix de Lyon in October 2003, defeating Julien Benneteau and Nicolas Mahut 6–1, 6–3 in the final.

Erlich advanced with Liezel Huber of South Africa to the semifinals in the mixed doubles tournament in 2004 at the Australian Open. They were defeated by Leander Paes and Martina Navratilova in the semifinals.

Ram and Erlich won the Lyon tournament again in October 2004.  They defeated Jonas Björkman and Radek Štěpánek 7–6, 6–2 in the final.  Erlich and Ram's next major tournament win was in Rotterdam in February 2005.  They beat Czechs Cyril Suk and Pavel Vízner 6–4, 4–6, 6–3 in the finals.  Ram and Erlich missed the French Open in 2005 due to the death of Ram's father shortly before the tournament was due to start.  They reached 8th place in the doubles ranking at the end of 2005, and served as alternates at the Masters Cup in Shanghai.

2006–2010
Erlich and Ram claimed the Adelaide title in March 2006, defeating Russians Dmitry Tursunov and Igor Kunitsyn 6–3, 6–2.

At the Cincinnati 1000 Masters, in August 2007, he and Ram won, upsetting the world No. 1 Bryan brothers in the final 4–6, 6–3, 13–11. In November 2007, they again defeated the No. 1 Bryan brothers at the Tennis Masters Cup in China, 7–6, 2–6, 6–1. At the 2007 US Open, he played doubles with Ram, losing to the eventual winners Simon Aspelin and Julian Knowle, 5–7, 6–7.

Erlich and Ram won their first Grand Slam at the 2008 Australian Open final against Arnaud Clément and Michaël Llodra 7–5, 7–6.

From September 2008 till May 2009 Erlich was recovering from right elbow surgery, and suffered setback after setback, while Ram was playing doubles with other partners. The Israel Open ATP Challenger tournament in May 2009 was the first where the two reunited. They proceeded to the tournament's final, where they lost to George Bastl and Chris Guccione 6–3, 7–63. After the tournament Ram announced that he was going to finish the season with his temporary partner Max Mirnyi, before returning to play with Erlich on a permanent basis.  Later the same month, Erlich partnering Harel Levy won his first ATP tournament after returning to play, the Türk Telecom İzmir Cup (an ATP Challenger Tour event).

Erlich partnered with Novak Djokovic at the 2010 Queen's Club Championships winning the title. It is Djokovic’s only doubles title in his career.

2021: 400 career match wins
In May 2021, Erlich won his 22nd doubles title at the 2021 Belgrade Open out of 44 finals with partner Andrei Vasilevski, the win being one match away from reaching a milestone of 400 career match wins.

2022: Retirement 
Erlich announced his retirement after his participation at the 2022 Tel Aviv Open partnering Novak Djokovic in September. He had to withdraw in the last minute due to injury thus completing his professional career.

Team Participation

Davis Cup

Playing for the Israel Davis Cup team in 2000 and from 2002–09, he has won 12 of his 16 matches, including wins in Israel's 2006 win over Great Britain, 2007 win over Luxembourg, 2007 wins over Italy and Chile (in which he and Ram defeated Olympic Gold Medal winners González and Massú), and 2009 win over Russia.

Israel (ranked 8th in the Davis Cup standings, with 5,394 points) hosted heavily favored Russia (winners in 2002 and 2006, and the top-ranked country in Davis Cup standings, with 27,897 points) in a Davis Cup quarterfinal tie in July 2009, on indoor hard courts at the Nokia Arena in Tel Aviv.  Israel was represented by Erlich, Ram, Dudi Sela, and Harel Levy.  Russia's lineup consisted of Marat Safin (# 24 in the world; former world # 1), Igor Andreev (26), Igor Kunitsyn (35), and Mikhail Youzhny (44; former world # 8).  The stage was set by Safin, who prior to the tie told the press:  "With all due respect, Israel was lucky to get to the quarterfinals."  The Israeli team's response was to beat the Russian team in each of their first three matches, thereby winning the tie.  Levy, world # 210, beat Russia's top player, Andreev, world # 24, 6–4, 6–2, 4–6, 6–2 in the opening match.  Sela (# 33) followed by beating Russian Youzhny 3–6, 6–1, 6–0, 7–5.  Israeli captain Eyal Ran likened his players to two fighter jets on court, saying:  "I felt as if I had two F-16s out there today, they played amazingly well." The match was attended by 10,500 people, the largest ever crowd ever for a tennis match held in Israel.  The next day Erlich and Ram beat Safin and Kunitsyn 6–3, 6–4, 6–7, 4–6, 6–4 in front of a boisterous crowd of over 10,000.  "This is something I will cherish for all of my life," said Erlich.  He added, "Everybody has dreams, but there are some you don’t allow yourself to have, and beating Russia 3–0 was just like that .. but we have done it."  Even the Saudi Gazette described the doubles match as a "thrilling" win.  Ran was carried shoulder-high around the Tel Aviv stadium, as the 10,000-strong crowd applauded.  With the tie clinched for Israel, the reverse singles rubbers were "dead", and instead of best-of-five matches, best-of-three sets were played, with the outcomes of little to no importance.  Israel wrapped up a 4–1 victory over Russia, as Levy defeated Kunitsyn 6–4, 4–6, 7–6, while Sela retired with a wrist injury while down 3–4 in the first set against Andreev.

Olympics

Erlich and Ram represented Israel at the 2004 Summer Olympics in Athens, Greece, and reached the quarterfinals.  They also represented Israel at the 2008 Summer Olympics in Beijing, China.

Major finals

Doubles: 1 (1 title)

ATP career finals

Doubles: 45 (22 titles, 23 runners-up)

Challenger and Futures finals

Singles: 1 (0–1)

Doubles: 48 (32–16)

Doubles performance timeline

See also
 List of select Jewish tennis players

References

External links
 
 Jonathan Erlich at the Jewish Virtual Library
 

1977 births
Living people
Argentine Jews
Tennis players from Buenos Aires
Sportspeople from Haifa
Sportspeople from Tel Aviv
Argentine emigrants to Israel
Israeli Jews
Israeli male tennis players
Jewish Argentine sportspeople
Jewish tennis players
Olympic tennis players of Israel
Tennis players at the 2004 Summer Olympics
Tennis players at the 2008 Summer Olympics
Tennis players at the 2012 Summer Olympics
Wingate Institute alumni
Grand Slam (tennis) champions in men's doubles
Israeli people of Argentine-Jewish descent
Sportspeople of Argentine descent
Australian Open (tennis) champions